In Greek mythology, the naiads are a type of female spirit, or nymph, presiding over fountains, wells, springs, streams, brooks and other bodies of fresh water.

They are distinct from river gods, who embodied rivers, and the very ancient spirits that inhabited the still waters of marshes, ponds and lagoon-lakes such as pre-Mycenaean Lerna in the Argolis.

Etymology 

Mythology

Naiads were often the object of archaic local cults, worshipped as essential to humans. Boys and girls at coming-of-age ceremonies dedicated their childish locks to the local naiad of the spring. In places like Lerna their waters' ritual cleansings were credited with magical medical properties. Animals were ritually drowned there. Oracles might be situated by ancient springs.

Naiads could be dangerous: Hylas of the Argo’s crew was lost when he was taken by naiads fascinated by his beauty. The naiads were also known to exhibit jealous tendencies. Theocritus's story of naiad jealousy was that of a shepherd, Daphnis, who was the lover of Nomia or Echenais; Daphnis had on several occasions been unfaithful to Nomia and as revenge she permanently blinded him. The nymph Salmacis raped Hermaphroditus and fused with him when he tried to escape.

The water nymph associated with particular springs was known all through Europe in places with no direct connection with Greece, surviving in the Celtic wells of northwest Europe that have been rededicated to Saints, and in the medieval Melusine.

Walter Burkert points out, "When in the Iliad [xx.4–9] Zeus calls the gods into assembly on Mount Olympus, it is not only the well-known Olympians who come along, but also all the nymphs and all the rivers; Okeanos alone remains at his station", Greek hearers recognized this impossibility as the poet's hyperbole, which proclaimed the universal power of Zeus over the ancient natural world: "the worship of these deities," Burkert confirms, "is limited only by the fact that they are inseparably identified with a specific locality."

Interpretation
Robert Graves offered a sociopolitical reading of the common myth-type in which a mythic king is credited with marrying a naiad and founding a city: it was the newly arrived Hellenes justifying their presence. The loves and rapes of Zeus, according to Graves' readings, record the supplanting of ancient local cults by Olympian ones (Graves 1955, passim).

So, in the back-story of the myth of Aristaeus, Hypseus, a king of the Lapiths, married Chlidanope, a naiad, who bore him Cyrene. Aristaeus had more than ordinary mortal experience with the naiads: when his bees died in Thessaly, he went to consult them. His aunt Arethusa invited him below the water's surface, where he was washed with water from a perpetual spring and given advice.

Types and individual names

Place names
 St. Charles Avenue in New Orleans was formerly known as Nyades Street, and is parallel to Dryades Street.
 Naiad Lake in Antarctica is named after the nymphs.

Gallery

See also
 
 Camenae
 Lady of the Lake
 Mermaid
 Naia
 Nix
 Ondine
 Rusalka
 Siren

Notes

References

 Bibliotheca (Pseudo-Apollodorus) 2.95, 2.11, 2.21, 2.23, 1.61, 1.81, 1.7.6
 Homer. Odyssey 13.355, 17.240, Iliad 14.440, 20.380
 Ovid. Metamorphoses
 Hesiod. Theogony
 Burkert, Walter, Greek Religion, Harvard University Press, 1985. .
 Robert Graves, The Greek Myths 1955
 Edgar Allan Poe, "Sonnet to Science" 1829

 
Nymphs
Bogs, fens and marshes in mythology